Morven is a city in Brooks County, Georgia, United States. It is part of the Valdosta, Georgia Metropolitan Statistical Area. The city was named after a mountain in Scotland. The population was 565 at the 2010 census. It was formerly known as Sharpe's Store.

History 
Morven is the oldest community established by Europeans in Brooks County.

The Coffee Road was opened through Morven circa 1823. Sion Hall, one of the first settlers, saw an opportunity to use his sawmill and to farm. The area was developed for large cotton plantations, based on enslaved African-American field workers.

Circa 1826, Hamilton Sharpe built a store made of logs; he opened a post office in 1828. The community that grew up around the store became known as Sharpe's Store. In the same year a Methodist campground was established named Mount Zion. The post office and community was renamed Morven in 1853. At the end of the century, the South Georgia Railroad was built through Morven in 1897. The community was incorporated by the state legislature in 1900.

Cotton cultivation continued to be important in the early 20th century. Hampton Smith owned the Old Joyce Place near Morven. Often hiring laborers through convict leasing, by which Smith paid police their high fees for minor infractions, Smith was known to be abusive to his black workers. On 16 May 1918, Smith was shot and killed by Sidney Johnson, a black worker whom he had severely beaten.

During the ensuing manhunt in Brooks and Lowndes counties, white mobs captured at least 12 blacks and lynched them during the next few days. All but one were men; the victims included 19-year-old Mary Turner, who had denounced the lynching of her husband, and her eight-month-old fetus, cut from her body and also murdered at the site, on the west bank of the Little River.

A second railroad (Valdosta/Morven & Western RR) was built through Morven in the 1920s. In 1923 the town raised an $8,000 bond to provide a water system. A group of local women organized to gain installation of electric lights in August 1924. After World War II, the first paved road was built in the community in the winter of 1948 to 1949 from Quitman, the county seat of Brooks County.

Geography
Morven is located at  (30.944263, -83.500796).

Demographics

As of the census of 2000, there were 634 people, 225 households, and 152 families residing in the city. The racial makeup of the city was 41.48% White, 52.05% African American, 0.16% Native American, 6.31% from other races. Hispanic or Latino of any race were 7.41% of the population.

There were 225 households, out of which 35.6% had children under the age of 18 living with them, 44.0% were married couples living together, 18.7% had a female householder with no husband present, and 32.4% were non-families. 28.9% of all households were made up of individuals, and 14.2% had someone living alone who was 65 years of age or older.  The average household size was 2.76 and the average family size was 3.39.

In the city, the population was spread out, with 30.8% under the age of 18, 9.9% from 18 to 24, 27.1% from 25 to 44, 18.8% from 45 to 64, and 13.4% who were 65 years of age or older.  The median age was 33 years. For every 100 females, there were 98.1 males.  For every 100 females age 18 and over, there were 87.6 males.

The median income for a household in the city was $23,438, and the median income for a family was $25,167. Males had a median income of $21,667 versus $20,750 for females. The per capita income for the city was $11,126.  About 20.6% of families and 24.6% of the population were below the poverty line, including 22.4% of those under age 18 and 28.0% of those age 65 or over.

Government 
The city government consists of a five-member city council and a mayor. There are only six paid employees, consisting of a city clerk, a police chief and two patrolmen, and two maintenance people.

Major highways
 State Route 76
 State Route 133
Coffee Road passes through the county.

Historical sites

Coffee Road
Coffee Road was opened up by the state legislature act approved December 23, 1822. $1500 was appropriated for the road, which started near Cunningham Ford on the Alapaha River southwest through districts 10, 12, and 13 of Irwin County continuing through Districts 18 and 23 of Early County to intersect the Florida state line near the Ochlockonee River.

References

External links
 City of Morven at Georgia.gov

Cities in Georgia (U.S. state)
Cities in Brooks County, Georgia
Cities in the Valdosta metropolitan area